The 2012 Asian Beach Volleyball Championship was a beach volleyball event, that was held from November 1 to 4, 2012 in Haikou, China.

Medal summary

Participating nations

Men

 (2)
 (3)
 (2)
 (1)
 (1)
 (1)
 (2)
 (1)
 (2)
 (2)
 (1)
 (2)

Women

 (1)
 (3)
 (2)
 (1)
 (1)
 (2)
 (2)
 (1)

Men's tournament

Preliminary round

Pool A 

|}

Pool B 

|}

Pool C 

|}

Pool D 

|}

Knockout round

Women's tournament

Preliminary round

Pool A 

|}

Pool B 

|}

Pool C 

|}

Pool D 

|}

Knockout round

References 

Men's Results
Women's Results

External links
Asian Volleyball Confederation

Asian Championships
Beach volleyball
Beach volleyball
Asian Beach Volleyball Championship